Armando Jesús Félix Holguín (born 11 July 1948) is a Mexican politician from the National Action Party. From 2006 to 2009 he served as Deputy of the LX Legislature of the Mexican Congress representing Sonora. He also served as municipal president of Cajeme from 1988 to 1991, and again from 2003 to 2006.

References

1948 births
Living people
Politicians from Sonora
National Action Party (Mexico) politicians
20th-century Mexican politicians
21st-century Mexican politicians
Deputies of the LX Legislature of Mexico
Members of the Chamber of Deputies (Mexico) for Sonora
Municipal presidents in Sonora